One Night in the Tropics is a 1940 comedy film which was the film debut of Abbott and Costello. They are listed as supporting actors but have major exposure with five of their classic routines, including an abbreviated version of "Who's On First?" Their work earned them a two-picture deal with Universal, and their next film, Buck Privates, made them bona fide stars. Songs in the film were by Jerome Kern with lyrics by Dorothy Fields. The film is based on a 1914 novel, Love Insurance by Earl Derr Biggers, the creator of Charlie Chan.

It was filmed as a silent movie in 1919 as Love Insurance by Paramount with Bryant Washburn and Lois Wilson, and in 1925 by Universal as The Reckless Age.

Plot
Jim "Lucky" Moore, an insurance salesman, devises a novel policy for his friend, Steve: a 'love insurance policy', that will pay out $1-million if Steve does not marry his fiancée, Cynthia. Encouraged by Jim's argument that Jim has never had to pay out on a policy so that the marriage is a sure thing, Steve accepts. The upcoming marriage is jeopardized by Steve's ex-girlfriend, Mickey, and Cynthia's disapproving Aunt Kitty. The policy is underwritten by a nightclub owner, Roscoe, who sends two enforcers to ensure that the wedding occurs as planned. Everyone involved in the situation winds up sailing or flying to San Marcos (a fictional South American country), where another complication develops, when Lucky becomes enamored of Cynthia. Lucky eventually marries Cynthia, but Roscoe does not have to pay the $1-million because Steve marries Mickey.

Cast
Allan Jones as Jim "Lucky" Moore
Nancy Kelly as Cynthia Merrick
Bud Abbott as Abbott
Lou Costello as Costello
Robert Cummings as Steve Harper
Mary Boland as Aunt Kitty Marblehead
William Frawley as Roscoe
Peggy Moran as Mickey Fitzgerald
Leo Carrillo as Escobar
Don Alvarado as Rodolfo
Nina Orla as Nina
Edgar Dearing as Cop with Black Eye (uncredited)
Larry Steers as Desk Clerk (uncredited)

Production
One Night in the Tropics was filmed from August 26 through September 30, 1940 under the film's working title, Riviera, an unproduced Jerome Kern musical from 1937 originally planned for Danielle Darrieux;

It was hoped that the film would ease Universal's financial plight. It did little to help, but led to a string of Abbott and Costello films that did save Universal.

Kern's songs were reused in the film.

It had several working titles before Universal settled on One Night in the Tropics, including Moonlight in the Tropics, Love Insurance, and Caribbean Holiday.

Promotion
Just prior to the beginning of production, on August 21, 1940, Jones and Cummings were guests on Abbott and Costello's radio show and promoted the film.

World premiere
The film had its world premiere in Costello's home town of Paterson, New Jersey on October 30, 1940.

Rerelease
The film was re-released (at 69 minutes) by Realart Pictures in 1950 with The Naughty Nineties and in 1954 with Little Giant.

Home media
This film has been released twice on DVD.  The first time, on The Best of Abbott and Costello Volume One on February 10, 2004, and again on October 28, 2008 as part of Abbott and Costello: The Complete Universal Pictures Collection.

References

External links
 

1940 films
Abbott and Costello films
American black-and-white films
Films directed by A. Edward Sutherland
1940 comedy films
Universal Pictures films
Films based on American novels
Films based on works by Earl Derr Biggers
American comedy films
1940s English-language films
1940s American films